Walled Lake is the fourth largest lake in Oakland County, Michigan, United States, and is located in Walled Lake and Novi, Michigan in southeastern Michigan.

See also
List of lakes in Michigan

References 

Lakes of Oakland County, Michigan
Tourist attractions in Oakland County, Michigan
Lakes of Michigan
Kettle lakes in the United States